Salagala Benjamin (1927-2011) was an Indian politician. He was a Member of Parliament, representing Bapatla in the Lok Sabha, the lower house of India's Parliament, as a member of the Indian National Congress.

References

External links
Official biographical sketch in Parliament of India website

Lok Sabha members from Andhra Pradesh
Indian National Congress politicians
India MPs 1989–1991
1927 births
2011 deaths
Indian National Congress politicians from Andhra Pradesh